Minck Oosterveer (19 July 1961 – 17 September 2011) was a Dutch cartoonist.

Biography
Oosterveer was a highly respected cartoonist in the Netherlands and worked on acclaimed series like: Ronson Inc., Zodiak, Nicky Saxx and others.

In 2009 he worked with Mark Waid on The Unknown, a 4-issue limited series published by Boom Studios.

Minck died of a motorcycle accident when driving home on his motorcycle. There were no other vehicles involved in the accident.

Awards
He is the winner of the 2011 Stripschapprijs.

Bibliography

European comics
 Storm
 De Banneling van Thoem (Senario: Willem Ritstier)

 Ronson Inc.
 De afrekening (Senario: Willem Ritstier)
 Goudeerlijk (Senario: Willem Ritstier)

 Trunk
 De onbekende soldaat (Senario: Willem Ritstier)
 Red Knight
 Excalibur
 Claudia Brücken
 De wraak van de Witte Engel (Senario: Willem Ritstier)
 Een winter in Parijs (Senario: Willem Ritstier)
 5 vóór 12 (Senario: Willem Ritstier)
 "Operatie sneeuw" (Senario: Willem Ritstier)

US comics
 Zombie Tales
2. Zombie Tales Oblivion
4. Zombie Tales - The Series

 The Unknown
1. The Devil made Flesh
2. The Devil made Flesh
3. The Devil made Flesh
4. The Devil made Flesh
1. The Unknown
2. The Unknown
3. The Unknown
4. The Unknown

 Ruse
3. Ruse

 Spider-Man
 Spider Island: Deadly Foes

 Maps Of Earth Conspiracies
 Just For Fun

Newspaper comics
 Nicky Saxx
 Zodiak
 Jack Pott

References

1961 births
2011 deaths
Dutch cartoonists
Dutch comics artists
Artists from Dordrecht
Road incident deaths in the Netherlands
Motorcycle road incident deaths
Winners of the Stripschapsprijs